Marie-Ange Mushobekwa Likulia is a Congolese politician. She serves as the Minister for Human rights of the Democratic Republic of the Congo.

References

Living people
Government ministers of the Democratic Republic of the Congo
Women government ministers of the Democratic Republic of the Congo
Year of birth missing (living people)
21st-century Democratic Republic of the Congo people
21st-century Democratic Republic of the Congo women politicians
21st-century Democratic Republic of the Congo politicians